Francisco Contreras (born 21 March 1984) is a Dominican professional boxer. He is trained by former world champion Robert Garcia.

Early life 
Contreras was raised in a poor family, he first entered a boxing gym at the age of five. His father Bonifacio was also a boxer and even had two brothers who were also boxers.

Amateur career 
Francisco was a member of the Dominican national team and ended his amateur career with a record of 350–14.

Professional career 
In September 2008, Contreras beat José Herley Zúñiga Montaño to win the WBC CABOFE light welterweight title.

References

External links 

Lightweight boxers
1984 births
Living people
Dominican Republic male boxers